Beerston is a hamlet in Delaware County, New York. It is located south-southwest of Walton at the corner of NY–10 and Beers Brook Road. Beers Brook converges with the West Branch Delaware River, which flows west through the hamlet.

References

Geography of Delaware County, New York
Hamlets in Delaware County, New York
Hamlets in New York (state)